Tomasz Sokołowski (born 27 April 1977) is Polish football manager and former player, most recently in charge of Legia Warsaw II.

References

External links
 

Polish footballers
Amica Wronki players
Legia Warsaw players
Legia Warsaw II players
Arka Gdynia players
GKS Katowice players
Living people
1977 births
People from Dębica
Sportspeople from Podkarpackie Voivodeship
Association football defenders
Polish football managers